Randy Ciarlante is an American musician who frequently played with The Band. He joined The Band in 1990, singing harmony and playing drums. He played and sang on their albums from the 1990s, including Jericho, High on the Hog and Jubilation. After the Band dissolved, he joined the Jim Weider Band from 1998 to 2006 and continues to play occasionally with Weider's Percolator band. In 2006, he joined the Organiks, a band based in Woodstock, New York, in which he is a primary vocalist, songwriter and drummer, along with Bruce Katz, Jay Collins and Chris Vitarello.  Randy Ciarlante has also been a mainstay of the Woodstock music scene since 1981 and has played with many of that area's leading musicians over the years.

Discography

With Eric Andersen

1968  More Hits from Tin Can Alley

With The Band

1993 Jericho
1993 The 30th Anniversary Concert Celebration (tribute to Bob Dylan)
1995 Let It Rock (tribute to Ronnie Hawkins)
1996 Not Fade Away (Remembering Buddy Holly)
1996 High on the Hog
1998 Jubilation
1999 Tangled Up in Blues
1999 The Best of The Band, Vol. II

With Rick Danko

1997 Rick Danko in Concert
1999 Live on Breeze Hill
2000 Times Like These

With Levon Helm

2000 Souvenir, Vol. 1

With Jim Weider

2000 Big Foot
2003 Remedy
2006 Percolator

With Mad Conductor

2010 Central America
2015 Space Rock Steady

References

External links

The Band members
Living people
Singer-songwriters from New York (state)
American percussionists
American rock drummers
American male singer-songwriters
American rock singers
American rock songwriters
Year of birth missing (living people)